Səni Belə Sevmədilər is a 2015 compilation album by Aygun Kazimova, composed of songs released in her 2008–2015 albums.

Track listing

Music videos
 "Düşün Məni"

Notes

External links
  - Aygün Kazımova Album İnfo
 Aygün Kazımova Translations
 Aygun Kazimova Fun Club

Aygün Kazımova albums
2015 compilation albums